Timothy M. Shanahan is an American geologist and Associate Professor of Geological Sciences at Jackson School of Geosciences, University of Texas-Austin. He is known for his works on paleoclimatology and environmental change.
Shanahan is a Kavli Fellow of National Academy of Sciences.

References

Living people
University of Texas at Austin faculty
21st-century American geologists
American hydrologists
Members of the United States National Academy of Sciences
Date of birth missing (living people)
Place of birth missing (living people)
Year of birth missing (living people)